Yanacocha (Quechua yana black, qucha lake, "black lake") is a  mountain and a nearby lake of that name in the Huaguruncho mountain range in the Andes of Peru. The mountain and the lake are located in the Pasco Region, Pasco Province, Huachón District, south of Huaguruncho.

References

Mountains of Peru
Mountains of Pasco Region
Lakes of Peru
Lakes of Pasco Region